Bomarzo  is a novel by the Argentine writer Manuel Mujica Lainez, written in 1962 and  later adapted by its author to an opera libretto set by Alberto Ginastera, which had its premiere in Washington, D.C., in 1967. 

It is set in the eerie and surrealistic Italian Renaissance town and palace of Bomarzo and concerns the morally and physically deformed Pier Francesco Orsini, Duke of Bomarzo.

References

1962 Argentine novels
Novels by Manuel Mujica Lainez
Argentine historical novels
Novels set in Italy
Lazio